The Prone Gunman (La Position du tireur couché) is a thriller written by Jean-Patrick Manchette that was published in 1981.

Edition 
The novel was published by Gallimard in the Black Series collection. 

In 2010, illustrator Jacques Tardi produced an illustrated adaptation of the book.

Adaptations

In film 
 Le choc (English: The Shock) – French film directed by Robin Davis with Alain Delon, Catherine Deneuve and Philippe Leotard
 The Gunman, American-French-Spanish movie directed by Pierre Morel with Sean Penn, Idris Elba and Javier Bardem.

Comics 
 La Position du tireur couché – adaptation and drawings Jacques Tardi, from the novel by Jean-Patrick Manchette, Futuropolis 2010,

References 

Novels by Jean-Patrick Manchette
French novels adapted into films
1981 French novels
Éditions Gallimard books